Dr Manoj Durairaj   is an Indian heart transplant surgeon, based in Pune. He was awarded “Pro Ecclesia et Pontifice” in November 2021. He has been working as Director, Marian Cardiac Centre and Research Foundation, Pune, India, the firsts heart transplant centre in Pune, and Director of Heart and Lung Transplant Program  Sahyadri Hospital, Pune, India.

Family and educational background 
Dr Manoj Durairaj was born on February 3, 1971, at Pune, India, to Dr. Manuel Durairaj, Professor of Cardiology and former Honorary Physician served as the honorary physician to three India presidents — N Sanjeeva Reddy, R Venkataraman and Gyani Zail Singh. His mother, Valsamma Durairaj, is engaged in the charismatic movement in Poona Diocese, Maharashtra, India. 
Manoj Durairaj did his schooling at St. Vincent's High School, Pune, India. Then he went to pursue his  M.B.B.S. at Rajah Muthiah Medical College, Annamalai University, Chidambaram, Tamil Nadu, India (1988-1994). He completed his M.S. (General Surgery) at Armed Forces Medical College, Poona University, Pune, Maharashtra, India (1995-1998). He completed M. Ch. (Cardiothoracic and Vascular Surgery), at All India Institute of Medical Sciences, New Delhi, India (1999-2002). He earned his Advanced Fellowship in Cardiac Surgery, from Austin, Melbourne University, Victoria, Australia (2002-2005).. Currently he is Junior Vice President, Indian Association for Cardiothoracic Surgeons.

Career 
Dr. Manoj Durairaj is a cardiac surgeon, practicing Pediatric and Adult Cardiac Surgery. Dr. Manoj Durairaj performed Pune's first heart transplant. By creating two centers for heart transplantation in Pune, India, he pioneered the heart transplantation program in the city. He conducted the first heart transplant in Nagpur in June 2019 as the Program Director of the Department of Heart Transplantation at Sahyadri Hospital. Further, his team completed Pune's first successful left ventricular assist device (LVAD), which replaces the left part of the heart with a mechanical pump. Through the project  “Saving Little Hearts” run by Marian Cardiac Centre and Research Foundation, Pune, India, he has helped more than 600 lives.

Dr Manoj Durairaj was presented with the Governor of Lagos Award for performing the city's first pediatric heart surgery. Additionally, he led a team to Sanaa, Yemen, where he performed the nation's first off-pump coronary surgery at the Al Thawara government hospital. He has operated more than 350 heart patients from the marginalised sections free of cost. 

Dr Manoj Durairaj has performed more than 30 Heart Transplant. He has done more than 15,000 successful heart surgeries, many of which are for the poor and the destitutes.

Awards and honours 
Durairaj was honoured by the Vatican with the highest medal, Pro Ecclesia et Pontifice for lay individuals for his professional brilliance in the field of heart transplantation and his philanthropic activities. This award was established in 1888 by Pope Leo XIII. In 2018, he was elected as a Fellow of the American College of Cardiology. He is the only cardiac surgeon in Pune to have received this distinction.

He was presented with the Governor of Lagos Award for performing the first paediatric heart surgery in Lagos State, Nigeria in July 2011. In February 2018, the Research Society of B J Medical College presented him with the Dr BB Dixit award for his pioneering effort in the field of heart transplantation in Pune and for his work as a philanthropist.

Dr. Manoj Durairaj was honoured as an "Outstanding Citizen of Pune" by the Mayor of Pune for his charity efforts and for initiating the heart transplant program in Pune during the Pune Municipal Corporation's Republic Day Awards 2018. He was designated by the Gujarat government as a Heart Transplant Inspector, responsible for issuing licenses to hospitals to do heart transplantation. He manages a humanitarian fund that has assisted hundreds of children in receiving free open-heart surgery, including heart transplantation. He was presented with the Hriduyamitra Award by the Deputy Charity Commissioner of Pune for his support of pediatric heart transplantation and assistance with over 350 youngsters undergoing open-heart surgery. He was also presented with the Rotary Club of Poona's Vocational Service Award 2021 by Deepak Londhe, the club's president.

With 28 years of experience, he is regarded as one of the best Cardiac Surgeons in Pune., who keeps himself regularly updated.

Here are his YouTube talks.

A Big Heart for Healing Little Hearts: An Interview with Dr Manoj Durairaj in Asian Journal of Religious Studies.

References 

1971 births
Living people
People from Pune
People from Tamil Nadu
Indian cardiac surgeons